A Heap of Broken Images is the debut studio album by American hip hop production duo Blue Sky Black Death. It was released by Mush Records in 2006.

The album title comes from the T. S. Eliot poem The Waste Land ("A heap of broken images, where the sun beats, and the dead tree gives no shelter, the cricket no relief").

Track listing

References

External links
 

2006 debut albums
Blue Sky Black Death albums
Mush Records albums